The Gordoniaceae are a family of bacteria in the order of Actinomycetales.

References

Further reading 
 
 

Bacteria families
Mycobacteriales